Terhune is an unincorporated community in Marion Township, Boone County, in the U.S. state of Indiana.

History
An early variant name was "Kimberlin". A post office was established as Kimberlin in 1879, the name was changed to Terhune in 1883, and the post office was discontinued in 1917.

Geography

References

Unincorporated communities in Boone County, Indiana
Unincorporated communities in Indiana
Indianapolis metropolitan area

http://www.leblib.org/heritage/BYCM_01_09.pdf